Dickoya  is a town in Nuwara Eliya District in the Central Province of Sri Lanka. Dickoya forms Hatton-Dickoya Urban Council with Hatton.

Popular places 
Christ Church Warleigh, Dickoya.

References 

Populated places in Nuwara Eliya District